The women's long jump event at the 1974 British Commonwealth Games was held on 29 and 31 January at the Queen Elizabeth II Park in Christchurch, New Zealand.

Medalists

Results

Qualification
Held on 29 January.

Final
Held on 31 January.

References

Athletics at the 1974 British Commonwealth Games
1974